Trout Pond is a lake located south of Horseshoe, New York. Fish species present in the lake are white sucker, yellow perch, large mouth bass, Northern pike and black bullhead. Access by trail from southwest of County Route 10.

See also
Little Trout Pond

References

Lakes of New York (state)
Lakes of St. Lawrence County, New York